Carex sterilis, common names dioecious sedge, sterile sedge and Atlantic sedge, is a perennial plant native to North America.

Conservation status in the United States
It is listed as a special concern in Connecticut, as threatened in Maine, Massachusetts and Minnesota, as endangered in Pennsylvania, as historical in Rhode Island, and as endangered and possibly extirpated in Tennessee.

References

sterilis
Flora of North America
Dioecious plants